Abdul Majeed Khan Niazi  is a Pakistani politician who had been a member of the National Assembly of Pakistan from August 2018 till January 2023. Previously he was a Member of the Provincial Assembly of the Punjab, from May 2013 to May 2018.

Early life
He was born on 23 September 1981 in Layyah District.

Political career

He was elected to the Provincial Assembly of the Punjab as a candidate of Pakistan Tehreek-e-Insaf (PTI) from Constituency PP-262 (Layyah-I) in 2013 Pakistani general election. He received 35,684 votes and defeated an independent candidate, Muhammad Athar Maqbool.

He was elected to the National Assembly of Pakistan as a candidate of PTI from Constituency NA-187 (Layyah-I) in 2018 Pakistani general election.

External Link

More Reading
 List of members of the 15th National Assembly of Pakistan

References

Living people
Punjab MPAs 2013–2018
1980 births
People from Layyah District
Pakistan Tehreek-e-Insaf politicians
Pakistani MNAs 2018–2023